The Red Bull Ring is a motorsport race track in Spielberg, Styria, Austria.

When Formula One outgrew the circuit, a plan was drawn up to extend the layout. Parts of the circuit, including the pits and main grandstand, were demolished, but construction work was stopped and the circuit remained unusable for several years before it was purchased by Red Bull's Dietrich Mateschitz and rebuilt. Renamed the Red Bull Ring the track was reopened on 15 May 2011 and subsequently hosted a round of the 2011 DTM season and a round of the 2011 F2 championship. Formula One returned to the circuit in the 2014 season, and MotoGP returned to the circuit in the 2016 season. The Red Bull Ring also hosted a second F1 event named the Styrian Grand Prix in 2020 and 2021; and a second MotoGP event named the Styrian motorcycle Grand Prix in 2020 and 2021 after the COVID-19 pandemic affected the schedules of both of those seasons.

Österreichring (1969–1995)

Originally built in 1969 to replace the bland and bumpy Zeltweg Airfield circuit located just across the street, the Österreichring track was situated in the Styrian mountains and it was a visually spectacular and scenic circuit. It had noticeable changes in elevation during the course of a lap,  from lowest to highest point. Like most fast circuits it was a hard circuit on engines but more difficult on tires, because of the speeds being so consistently high. There were other testing corners such as Voest-Hugel, which was a flat-out  right-hander that eventually led to the  Sebring-Auspuff Kurve (this corner had many names over the years, Dr. Tiroch and Glatz Kurve were others) which was an essential corner to get right because of the long straight afterwards that led to the Bosch Kurve.

Some of the track was just road with little to no protection at all, even up to the final Austrian Grand Prix there in 1987, a race that had to be restarted twice because of two progressively more serious accidents both caused by the narrow pit straight in a similar manner to the 1985 race when the race was stopped after one lap following a start line shunt that had taken out three cars including championship leader Michele Alboreto's Ferrari and local driver Gerhard Berger's Arrows-BMW. In practice for the 1987 race McLaren's Stefan Johansson narrowly avoided serious injury or worse when at over  he collided with a deer that had made its way onto the track while Johansson was cresting a blind brow before the Jochen Rindt Kurve behind the pits.

At the time it was second only in F1 average speed to Keke Rosberg's  pole lap of the Silverstone Circuit set during the 1985 British Grand Prix. Both times were set using a turbocharged Williams-Honda.

In 1976, the Vost-Hugel Kurve was tightened and made into one right hander rather than two right-handers with a small section between, and in 1977 it was slowed down and became the Hella-Licht chicane, going from the fastest to the slowest corner on the track. It is also known that four-time World Champion Alain Prost often said that all tracks can be changed but that the Österreichring should remain unchanged, just adding run-off areas would be fine, which eventually did happen up until the original track's final year in 1995. Motorcycle rider Hans-Peter Klampfer died after a collision with another rider at the Bosch Kurve (where most fatalities happened) and 29-year-old Hannes Wustinger was also killed after a crash at the Tiroch Kurve (the part that was left out of the present circuit) at a race for the Austrian Touring car championship and this sealed the decision to build a new circuit.

Triple World Champion and long time hero of the home crowd Niki Lauda is the only Austrian driver to win his home Grand Prix. He won the 1984 Austrian Grand Prix at the Österreichring driving a McLaren-TAG Porsche. He announced his permanent retirement from driving at the circuit before the 1985 race.

A1-Ring (1996–2003)

The Österreichring's safety concerns had reached a head in the mid-1990s, and in 1995 and 1996 it was totally rebuilt, at the same site, by Hermann Tilke. Its three long straights, as well as a twisty infield section, asked for a setup compromise.

As much of the construction work was paid for by the mobile phone provider A1, the track was renamed the A1-Ring. It proceeded to host seven Formula One Austrian Grands Prix between 1997 and 2003, as well as several DTM races and the Austrian motorcycle Grand Prix in 1996 and 1997.

Red Bull Ring (2011–present)

After the contract termination of Austrian Grand Prix, the circuit was sold to Dietrich Mateschitz in 2004. The grandstands and pit buildings were demolished in 2004, rendering the track unusable for any motorsport category.

In late 2004 and early 2005, there were intense discussions concerning whether the owner of the circuit, Red Bull, would find another use for the site, or return motorsports to the venue. There was a circuit extension proposal using part of the old Österreichring. In January 2005, return of motorsports seemed more unlikely than ever, as Dietrich Mateschitz publicly announced that he had no intention of wasting money on a deficient circuit. Throughout 2005 however, there was speculation of the newly founded Red Bull Racing renovating the track to use it as a test venue.

In 2006, Austrian racing driver Alexander Wurz claimed he would buy the circuit and have it renovated, but the idea never came to fruition. By 2007, talks involving Red Bull, KTM, Volkswagen and Magna International for a neuer Österreichring failed, after VW pulled out.

Late in 2008, Red Bull began their €70m reconstruction of the track and DTM chiefs considered a return to the circuit in 2009, and in September 2010, it was confirmed that the circuit, now known as the Red Bull Ring, would host a round of the 2011 DTM season. The championship has visited the circuit every year since then until 2018.

In November 2010, F2 announced that Round 6 of the 2011 F2 championship would take place at the Red Bull Ring. The circuit was reopened at a special event over the weekend of 15–16 May 2011, which included displays of various Red Bull-sponsored teams including Red Bull Racing. The FIA Historic Formula One Championship was invited to provide the headline race attraction with a race on each day for Formula One cars from the 3-litre period.

In December 2012, Red Bull contacted the FIA to say the track would be available to host a round of the Formula One World Championship in 2013, after a slot became available following the postponement of the proposed New York metropolitan area Grand Prix of America, and by July 2013, Red Bull announced that the Austrian Grand Prix would return as a round of the Formula One World Championship in 2014. The Austrian Grand Prix was held on 22 June 2014.

From 2014 until 2016, the track also hosted a round of the Red Bull Air Race World Championship.

On 11 February 2016, it was announced that MotoGP would return to the circuit in 2016 for the first time since 1997.

On 30 June 2019, in honour of the late 3-time Formula One World Champion Niki Lauda, the first turn of the track was renamed the "Niki Lauda Turn".

On 30 May 2020, it was reported that the Austrian government had given permission for two Formula One races to be held on 5 and 12 July 2020 respectively to kick off the 2020 Formula One season after its start had been delayed by the COVID-19 pandemic.

On 2 June 2020, Formula One confirmed the Red Bull Ring would hold back to back races on 5 and 12 July to start the 2020 season, with the second race styled as a one-off Styrian Grand Prix. It would also hold the first four races of the 2020 FIA Formula 2 Championship and the 2020 FIA Formula 3 Championship. This made it the first European circuit to host the opening round of a Formula One season since the Circuit de Monaco did this in the 1966 season as well as the first time Austria hosted the opening race of the World Championship and therefore the first time the circuit hosted the opening round - an honour given to 13 previous venues since the inception of the World Championship in 1950. The circuit also hosted back to back races of the 2020 MotoGP season on 16 and 23 August, with the second race styled as a one off Styrian Grand Prix.

In the 2021 Formula One season, the Red Bull Ring hosted two races again due to the Canadian Grand Prix being cancelled and the Turkish Grand Prix being postponed because of the COVID-19 pandemic. The first of the two was titled as the Styrian Grand Prix, with the second being called the Austrian Grand Prix. These two races a week apart from each other saw Max Verstappen winning both from pole position. Also in MotoGP, following the cancellation of the Finnish Grand Prix in May 2021, the Styrian Grand Prix was added to the calendar on the weekend of 6 to 8 August, one week before the Austrian Grand Prix. The first race saw MotoGP rookie Jorge Martín claim his and Pramac Racing's first win in the premier class, whilst the second race saw Brad Binder take a shock home win for KTM despite finishing on dry tyres in wet conditions.

In January 2022, it was revealed that the circuit would be modified slightly for MotoGP and other motorcycle races, with a chicane being introduced at turn 2. However Formula One and other car racing series will continue to use the current layout.

Track configurations

Events

 Current

 April: F1 Academy, P9 Challenge, Porsche Sports Cup Suisse
 May: Ferrari Challenge Europe, GT2 European Series, TCR Eastern Europe Trophy, ACCR Formula 4 Championship, Supercar Challenge, Austria Formula 3 Cup, Histo-Cup Austria
 June: BOSS GP Austrian Historic am Red Bull Ring
 July: Formula One Austrian Grand Prix, FIA Formula 2 Championship, FIA Formula 3 Championship, Porsche Supercup, Porsche Sports Cup Deutschland
 August: Grand Prix motorcycle racing Austrian motorcycle Grand Prix, MotoE World Championship Austrian eRace, Red Bull MotoGP Rookies Cup, Sidecar World Championship, IDM Superbike Championship, Northern Talent Cup
 September: Deutsche Tourenwagen Masters, International GT Open, Euroformula Open Championship, Formula Regional European Championship, Renault Clio Cup Europe, TCR Europe Touring Car Series, ADAC GT Masters, Porsche Carrera Cup Germany, Porsche Carrera Cup France

 Former

 24H Series Hankook 12H Red Bull Ring (2017)
 ADAC Formula 4 (2015–2021)
 Auto GP (2014)
 BMW M1 Procar Championship (1979–1980)
 European Formula Two Championship (1972)
 European Le Mans Series 4 Hours of Red Bull Ring (2013–2018, 2021)
 European Touring Car Championship (1978–1979, 1982–1987, 2000–2001)
 European Truck Racing Championship (2001–2003, 2013–2017)
 FIA European Formula 3 Championship (1977–1984)
 FIA Formula 3 European Championship (2012–2018)
 FIA GT Championship (1997–1998, 2000–2001)
 FIM Endurance World Championship (1980–1987)
 Formula 3 Euro Series (2003)
 Formula 750 (1978–1979)
 Formula One Styrian Grand Prix (2020–2021)
 Formula Renault Eurocup (2013, 2016–2018)
 Grand Prix motorcycle racing Styrian motorcycle Grand Prix (2020–2021)
 International Formula 3000 (1985–1986, 1997–2003)
 Italian F4 Championship (2019–2022)
 Red Bull Air Race World Championship (2014–2016)
 Super Tourenwagen Cup (1994–1995)
 Superbike World Championship (1988–1994, 1997–1999)
 TCR International Series (2015)
 World Series Formula V8 3.5 (2013, 2015–2016)
 World Sportscar Championship 1000 km Zeltweg (1969–1976)
 W Series (2021)

Lap records
The official lap record for the current circuit layout is 1:05.619, set by Carlos Sainz Jr. driving for McLaren in the 2020 Styrian Grand Prix. The official fastest race lap records at the Red Bull Ring are listed as:

Concerts

Notes

References

External links

Map and circuit history of the Red Bull Ring at RacingCircuits.info
Trackpedia's guide to racing the A1-ring
tilke.de: A1-Ring, Österreich
2014 Austrian GP Preview – The Red Bull Ring
The Red Bull Ring on Google Maps (Current Formula 1 Tracks)

Red Bull Ring
Red Bull Ring
Red Bull Ring
Red Bull Ring
Red Bull Ring
Red Bull Ring
Red Bull Ring
Red Bull Ring
Red Bull Ring